Treboeth is a suburb and historical village in the Mynydd-Bach ward of Swansea, Wales. Gwyrosydd Primary School and Welsh language primary school Ysgol Gynradd Gymraeg Tirdeunaw are located in Treboeth. Gwyrosydd was the Bardic name of Treboeth-born Daniel James, author of the popular Welsh language hymn Calon Lân, which is often sung in rugby matches, Welsh religious ceremonies and other events.

The Swansea-Builth Wells National Cycle Route 43 passes through the village. The village is home to several places of worship including Caersalem Chapel, St Albans, Treboeth Gospel Hall and Mynyddbach Chapel.

Notable people
Cynog Dafis, Plaid Cymru politician and former M.P. for Ceredigion
Catherine Zeta-Jones actress 
Daniel James, the Welsh hymn writer.
Joanna Page, actress
Hannah Stone, Royal Harpist
Dame Jean Thomas, biochemist
Ceri Rhys Matthews, Traditional Folk Musician, Record producer.

References

Villages in Swansea